3C 236 is a Fanaroff and Riley Class II (FR II) radio galaxy. It is among the largest known radio galaxies, with the radio structure having a total linear size in excess of 4.5 Mpc (15 million light years). The galaxy features a "double-double" radio morphology consisting of the giant relic 4.5 Mpc source and an inner 2 kpc compact steep spectrum radio source. A recent starburst episode near the nucleus may be related to the event resulting in re-ignition of radio activity.

External links
PHYSORG
Harvard
Spitzer at Caltech
NASA
JPL
Universe Today
NRAO

References

Print sources
 Nature 250, 625 - 630 (23 August 1974)
 Nature 257,  99 - 103 (11 September 1975)

Radio galaxies
236
29329
29329

Leo Minor